The 1951–52 Manitoba Junior Hockey League season

League notes
The Winnipeg Canadiens were bought and renamed the St. Boniface Canadiens.

Regular season

Playoffs
Semi-Final
Brandon defeated St. Boniface 4-games-to-1
Turnbull Cup Championship
Monarchs defeated Brandon 4-games-to-2
Western Memorial Cup Semi-Final
Monarchs lost to Fort William Hurricanes (TBJHL) 3-games-to-1 with 2 games tied

Awards

All-Star Teams

References 
Manitoba Junior Hockey League
Manitoba Hockey Hall of Fame
Hockey Hall of Fame
Winnipeg Free Press Archives
Brandon Sun Archives

MJHL
Manitoba Junior Hockey League seasons